The 2018 Kentucky Derby (officially, the 2018 Kentucky Derby presented by Woodford Reserve) was the 144th running of the Kentucky Derby, and took place on Saturday, May 5, 2018, in Louisville, Kentucky. The field was open to 20 horses, with a purse of  million. The Derby is held annually in Louisville on the first Saturday in May, at the end of the two-week-long Kentucky Derby Festival.

The race was broadcast by NBC, with coverage by NBCSN of undercard races beginning at 12:30pm EDT and main network coverage of pre-race activities starting at 2:30pm EDT. Post time was 6:52pm EDT. The race was won by Justify, who was the post-time favorite, in a time of 2:04.20 over a sloppy track. It is the first time since 1882 that the race was won by a horse that did not race at the age of two.

Qualification

The Kentucky Derby is only open to three-year-old Thoroughbreds, thus all entrants in the 2018 race were part of the 2015 North American live foal crop of roughly 22,000. The field was limited to twenty horses who qualified based on points earned in the 2018 Road to the Kentucky Derby, a series of designated races that was first introduced in 2013. This point system replaced the previous graded stakes race earnings system.

The top points earner in the 2018 series was Magnum Moon (150 points), winner of the Rebel Stakes and Arkansas Derby. Good Magic, the champion two-year-old from 2017, finished second in the series by winning both the Breeders' Cup Juvenile and the Blue Grass Stakes. The other major prep winners were Noble Indy (Louisiana Derby), Mendelssohn (UAE Derby), Audible (Florida Derby), Vino Rosso (Wood Memorial) and Justify (Santa Anita Derby).

Churchill Downs also created separate qualification roads for horses based in Japan and Europe. None of the invitations for qualifiers on the Japan Road was accepted. On the European Road, the connections of Gronkowski accepted after the colt qualified first. However, the colt subsequently became ill and had to miss the race.

Field
The early favorite was Justify, who had made only three starts before the race but won each time with triple-digit Beyer Speed Figures. In the Derby, he had to surmount what came to be known as "Curse of Apollo" – a reference to the fact that no horse had ever won the Derby without racing while at age two since Apollo in 1882. "Justify is a natural and he's still green, just learning how to run. He's so talented", said his trainer Bob Baffert. "But there are a lot of nice horses out there this year."

Trainer Todd Pletcher, who won the 2017 Kentucky Derby with Always Dreaming, had four of the leading contenders: Magnum Moon, Audible, Vino Rosso, and Noble Indy. Magnum Moon was ranked number two on the National Thoroughbred Racing Association top three-year-old poll of April 16 after his win in the Arkansas Derby. He had made only four starts prior to the Kentucky Derby, like Justified not having raced at age two. Audible was ranked number three, while Vino Rosso and Noble Indy were ranked seventh and eighth respectively. 

The two colts with the best form at age two, Good Magic and Bolt d'Oro, were ranked fourth and fifth respectively on the same poll. They were the winter-book favorites for the Derby, but both suffered training setbacks that delayed their return to the racetrack. They both had one win from two starts at age three going into the Derby.

Adding an international element to the field was Mendelssohn, trained in Ireland by Aidan O'Brien. Mendelssohn started his racing career on the turf and proved his ability to ship well by winning the Breeders' Cup Juvenile Turf at Del Mar in California in 2017. However, O'Brien felt that the colt would be equally suited to racing on the dirt given his pedigree: Mendelssohn is a half brother to multiple Eclipse Award-winner Beholder. Mendelssohn earned his berth by winning the UAE Derby in an "astonishing" performance while setting a track record.

Entries for the Kentucky Derby were taken on May 1. Justify drew post position 7 and was installed as the 3-1 morning line favorite by oddsmaker Mike Battaglia.

Race Description

Because the Derby was held on a rainy day, the surface of the track was sealed to mitigate the effect of heavy rain on the footing. Nonetheless, the track condition was sloppy. Despite the rain, a crowd of 157,813 attended the event, the eighth largest in Derby history, and the wettest of all time. A record $149.2 million was bet on the Derby itself from all sources, while the full card earned an all-source handle of $225.7 million, up 8% from the previous year's record.

 
On the track, Justify's jockey Mike Smith used the colt's early speed to gain vantage position near the rail moving into the first turn. He was positioned just a length after Promises Fulfilled and maintained this position down the backstretch. Following them closely were Flameaway, Bolt d'Oro and Good Magic. Although the opening fractions (22.24 for the first quarter, 45.77 for the half, 1:11.01 for the three-quarters) were fast, Smith said Justify felt "very comfortable".

In the final turn, Bolt d'Oro and later Good Magic were both put to a drive, while Promises Fulfilled began to drop back. Justify responded to urging to open up a lead of  lengths as they turned into the stretch, widening to  lengths at the finish line. Bolt d'Oro tired, eventually finishing in twelfth place, but Good Magic persevered to finish second. Audible closed from twelfth place to finish third, just a head behind Good Magic.

It was the fifth Derby win for Baffert and the second for Smith.

Mendelssohn, who went off as the third choice in the betting, broke well from post position 14 but was hit hard shortly after the start by Magnum Moon, who veered over from post position 16. Losing ground and "banged around in traffic", Mendelssohn was eased and finished last. On the other hand, Instilled Regard, who broke from post position 15 and was also involved in the initial bumping incident, rallied from 17th place to finish fourth.

Results

Track: Sloppy (sealed)

Times:  mile – 22.24;  mile – 45.77;  mile – 1:11.01; mile – 1:37.35; final – 2:04.20.
Splits for each quarter-mile: (22.24) (23.53) (25.24) (26.34) (26.85)

Source: Equibase chart

Payout
The table below gives Kentucky Derby payout schedule

 $2 Exacta: (7-6) $69.60
 $1 Trifecta: (7-6-5) $141.40 
 $1 Superfecta: (7-6-5-15) $19,618.20
 $1 Super High Five: (7-6-5-15-10) $183,580.20

Subsequent Grade I wins
Several horses went on from the Derby to post Grade I wins. Most notably, Justify completed the American Triple Crown and was named Horse of the Year.
 Justify – Preakness Stakes, Belmont Stakes
 Good Magic – Haskell Invitational
 Vino Rosso – 2019 Gold Cup at Santa Anita Stakes, Breeders' Cup Classic
 Instilled Regard – 2020 Manhattan Stakes
 Promises Fulfilled – H. Allen Jerkens Stakes
 Combatant – 2020 Santa Anita Handicap

See also

References

External links

Post positions, silks, odds for 2018 Kentucky Derby

2018 in horse racing
Derby
2018
May 2018 sports events in the United States